Darıca (from the Byzantine τὰ Ῥίτζιον) is a town and district of Kocaeli Province in the Marmara region of Turkey. It was ceded from Gebze district in 2008. The current mayor is Şükrü Karabacak, former head coach of the Turkish athletics team. 

Darica takes its name from Darıca Castle which is situated in the centre of town and was constructed during the Roman period, between 297 BC and 74BC. Darıca has a population of approximately 150,000 and exhibits the third highest population density within the Kocaeli Province. In a contemporary context, the town plays host to an array of different cultures, however, prior to the 1920s, a vast majority of the population were of Greek origin. [Cite a source] 

Darica is in close proximity to large-scale transit infrastructure including the D-100 highway and the Turkish State Railway station for Kocaeli. Further, the district contains numerous social areas, plays host to a number of festivals and hosts the Faruk Yalçın Zoo in the Marmara Region.

Darica Coast
Bayramoglu is a peninsular area on the gulf near Darica and is known for its predominantly natural environment, garnering a reputation as the modern holiday centre in the Marmara Region. The area's endowment of modern recreation facilities and a small beach are combined with the traditionally warm climate to make it an attractive destination to domestic and international travellers. There are cafeterias, restaurants, picnic areas, children's play groups along the beach as well as designated areas for fishing. 

Dudayev Park is a suburban part of Darica in which families spend time within play areas, cafes, and walking areas. The area features an amphitheatre which is situated on the same land where the 'Fusion of Cultures and Cities' festival was held. During the festival, approximately 300,000 people descended on the park. 

Denize Sevgi Parkı features walking paths, cafes, restaurants, children's play groups and recreational areas within which residents play sport. From this area, there is also access to the sea. 

Sancaktepe has the highest hill of Darıca. On 200 acres of land, with 15,000 trees planted, there are picnic areas, walking paths and a cafe. The Sancaktepe Landscape design received two awards across the country.

Historic houses. Darıca was established 378 BC. It hosts many historic structures like houses, castle and a lighthouse. The lighthouse was built in 1896.

Faruk Yalçın Zoo and Botanical Park (previously the Bogaziçi Zoo and Botanical Park) is built into 200,000 m² area in Darıca and contains 3000 animals. The Park houses 300 kinds of animals and 500 kinds of plants.

References

External links 
 darica.bel.tr - Darıca Belediyesi resmi internet sitesi -

Districts of Kocaeli Province
Former Greek towns in Turkey